Sheykh Ali (also Romanized as Sheykh ‘Ālī; also known as Darreh Sheykh ‘Ālī) is a village in Bazoft Rural District, Bazoft District, Kuhrang County, Chaharmahal and Bakhtiari Province, Iran. At the 2006 census, its population was 166, in 31 families. The village is populated by Lurs.

References 

Populated places in Kuhrang County
Luri settlements in Chaharmahal and Bakhtiari Province